Alex Perry is a male former international table tennis player from England.

Table tennis career
He represented England at three World Table Tennis Championships in the Swaythling Cup (men's team event) from 1993-2000.

He won 14 English National Table Tennis Championships titles.

Personal life
He married fellow English international Nicola Deaton.

See also
 List of England players at the World Team Table Tennis Championships

References

English male table tennis players
1980 births
Living people
Commonwealth Games medallists in table tennis
Commonwealth Games gold medallists for England
Table tennis players at the 2002 Commonwealth Games
Medallists at the 2002 Commonwealth Games